The 1979 European Competition for Women's Football was a women's football tournament contested by European nations. It took place in Italy from 19 to 27 July 1979.

The tournament featured 12 teams, with games staged in Naples and Rimini. Considered unofficial because it was not run under the auspices of UEFA, it was a precursor to the UEFA Women's Championship. Denmark won the tournament, beating hosts Italy 2–0 in the final at Stadio San Paolo.

Tournament review
Economically, the tournament was not a success:

In the late 1970s the issue of international tournaments for women's football teams was contentious. The international governing body International Federation of Association Football (FIFA) refused several requests to sanction independently organised tournaments, declaring that such matters "were only possible through the National Association and the Confederations." Writing in 2007, Jean Williams observed that "The fact that they had been busy not organising these events seems to have escaped [FIFA's] notice. According to Williams, FIFA's bureaucratic suppression of women's football was becoming unsustainable: "By the 1970s it simply wasn't a viable option for FIFA to ignore women playing the game and hope that they would go away."

The European Confederation, Union of European Football Associations (UEFA), displayed little enthusiasm for women's football and were particularly hostile to Italy's independent women's football federation. Sue Lopez, a member of England's squad, contended that a lack of female representation in UEFA was a contributory factor:

At a conference on 19 February 1980 UEFA resolved to launch its own competition for women's national teams. The meeting minutes had registered the 1979 competition as a "cause for concern".

Results

First round
The top team in each group advanced to the semi-finals.

Group A

Group B

Group C

Group D

Knockout stage

Semi-finals

Third place match

Final
After a goalless first half, Denmark took the lead 10 minutes into the second period through 18–year–old striker Lone Smidt Hansen (who later became Lone Smidt Nielsen through marriage). Inge Hindkjær secured Denmark's victory with her fourth goal of the tournament, four minutes from full-time. After the tournament, the Danish Football Association (DBU) were subject to media criticism for their failure to properly develop women's football.

Winner

Notes

References

Bibliography

External links 
Results at RSSSF.com

UEFA Women's Championship tournaments
European Competition for Women's Football
International association football competitions hosted by Italy
European Competition for Women's Football
European Competition for Women's Football